The canton of La Chapelle-la-Reine is a French former administrative division, located in the arrondissement of Fontainebleau, in the Seine-et-Marne département (Île-de-France région). It was disbanded following the French canton reorganisation which came into effect in March 2015.

Demographics

Composition 
The canton of La Chapelle-la-Reine was composed of 18 communes:

Achères-la-Forêt
Amponville
Boissy-aux-Cailles
Boulancourt
Burcy
Buthiers
La Chapelle-la-Reine
Fromont
Guercheville
Larchant
Nanteau-sur-Essonne
Noisy-sur-École
Recloses
Rumont
Tousson
Ury
Le Vaudoué
Villiers-sous-Grez

See also
 Cantons of the Seine-et-Marne department
 Communes of the Seine-et-Marne department

References

Chapelle-la-Reine
2015 disestablishments in France
States and territories disestablished in 2015